Monic Marie Pérez Díaz (born February 1, 1990) is a Puerto Rican TV Host, model and beauty pageant titleholder who won Miss Universe Puerto Rico 2013 and represented Puerto Rico at Miss Universe 2013 in Moscow and placed Top 16.

Early life
Monic was born on February 1, 1990, in Bayamón, Puerto Rico, the oldest of three children, and moved to Long Island as a teenager. After high school she moved to Arecibo, Puerto Rico where she attended University of Puerto Rico, Arecibo campus, majoring in Nursing.

Miss Universe Puerto Rico 2013
On August 29, 2012, Monic represented Arecibo at the Miss Universe Puerto Rico 2013 pageant where she beat out 31 other contestants and won the title, gaining the right to represent Puerto Rico at Miss Universe. She also won the awards of Miss Photogenic, Payless Best Catwalk and Best Body, respectively.

Miss Universe 2013
Monic represented Puerto Rico at the 62nd annual Miss Universe. She quickly became the crowd favorite and in most countries was the predicted winner of the Miss Universe. She finished as Top 16 semi-finalist on November 9, 2013, vying to succeed outgoing titleholder Miss Universe 2012, Olivia Culpo of the United States. The eventual winner was Gabriela Isler of Venezuela. There are many rumors about Monic being sabotaged backstage prior to the show and given horrendous hair and makeup.

See also
 Miss Universe Puerto Rico 2013

References

External links
Miss Universe Puerto Rico Official Website

Living people
Puerto Rican beauty pageant winners
Miss Universe 2013 contestants
1990 births
People from Bayamón, Puerto Rico